Joe's So Mean to Josephine is a 1996 Canadian romantic drama film written and directed by Peter Wellington in his directorial debut. The film stars Eric Thal and Sarah Polley as Joe and Josephine, a couple that enters a romantic relationship despite the significant differences and incompatibilities.

The film's cast also includes Don McKellar, Waneta Storms, Jason Cadieux, Tracy Wright, Semi Chellas, Dixie Seatle and Rachel Luttrell.

At the 17th Genie Awards, Ron Sures was nominated for Best Original Score, and the film won that year's Claude Jutra Award for the best Canadian feature film by a first-time director.

References

External links

1996 films
1996 directorial debut films
1996 romantic drama films
1990s Canadian films
1990s English-language films
Best First Feature Genie and Canadian Screen Award-winning films
Canadian romantic drama films
English-language Canadian films
Films directed by Peter Wellington